The Team relay competition at the 2023 FIL World Luge Championships was held on 29 January 2023.

Results
The race was started at 13:43.

References

Team relay